Fox Farm is a 1922 British silent drama film directed by Guy Newall and starring Newall, Ivy Duke and Barbara Everest. It is based on the 1911 novel Fox Farm by Warwick Deeping. A farmer's wife becomes obsessed with the high life, and abandons him after he loses his sight. It was made at Beaconsfield Studios. Unlike many of the era, the film is still extant.

Cast
 Guy Newall - James Falconer 
 Ivy Duke - Ann Wetherall 
 Barbara Everest - Kate Falconer 
 Cameron Carr - Jack Rickerby 
 A. Bromley Davenport - Sam Wetherall 
 Charles Evemy - Slim Wetherall 
 John Alexander - Jacob Boase

References

Bibliography
 Bamford, Kenton. Distorted Images: British National Identity and Film in the 1920s. I.B. Tauris, 1999.
 Warren, Patricia. British Film Studios: An Illustrated History. Batsford, 2001.

External links

1922 films
British drama films
1922 drama films
British black-and-white films
British silent feature films
Films directed by Guy Newall
Films based on British novels
Films set in England
Films shot at Beaconsfield Studios
1920s English-language films
1920s British films
Silent drama films